In mathematics, especially algebraic geometry, the decomposition theorem of Beilinson, Bernstein and Deligne or BBD decomposition theorem is a set of results concerning the cohomology of algebraic varieties. It was originally conjectured by Gelfand and MacPherson.

Statement

Decomposition for smooth proper maps
The first case of the decomposition theorem arises via the hard Lefschetz theorem which gives isomorphisms, for a smooth proper map  of relative dimension d between two projective varieties

In fact, the particular case when Y is a point, amounts to the isomorphism

This hard Lefschetz isomorphism induces canonical isomorphisms

Moreover, the sheaves  appearing in this decomposition are local systems, i.e., locally free sheaves of Q-vector spaces, which are moreover semisimple, i.e., a direct sum of local systems without nontrivial local subsystems.

Decomposition for proper maps
The decomposition theorem generalizes this fact to the case of a proper, but not necessarily smooth map  between varieties. In a nutshell, the results above remain true when the notion of local systems is replaced by perverse sheaves.

The hard Lefschetz theorem above takes the following form: there is an isomorphism in the derived category of sheaves on Y:

Moreover, there is an isomorphism

where the summands are semi-simple perverse-sheaves, meaning they are direct sums of push-forwards of intersection cohomology sheaves.

If X is not smooth, then the above results remain true when  is replaced by the intersection cohomology complex .

Proofs
The decomposition theorem was first proved by Beilinson, Bernstein, and Deligne. Their proof is based on the usage of weights on l-adic sheaves in positive characteristic. A different proof using mixed Hodge modules was given by Saito. A more geometric proof, based on the notion of semismall maps was given by de Cataldo and Migliorini.

For semismall maps, the decomposition theorem also applies to Chow motives.

Applications of the theorem

Cohomology of a Rational Lefschetz Pencil 
This can be done using the perverse spectral sequence

Local invariant cycle theorem 

Let  be a proper morphism between complex algebraic varieties such that  is smooth. Then the restriction map

References

Survey Articles

Pedagogical References

Further reading 
BBDG decomposition theorem at nLab

Algebraic geometry